Cochylidichnium is a genus of moths belonging to the family Tortricidae.

Species
Cochylidichnium amulanum Razowski, 1986

See also
List of Tortricidae genera

References

 , 2005: World Catalogue of Insects vol. 5 Tortricidae.
 , 1986 Acta zool. cracov. 29: 381.
 , 2011: Diagnoses and remarks on genera of Tortricidae, 2: Cochylini (Lepidoptera: Tortricidae). Shilap Revista de Lepidopterologia 39 (156): 397-414.

External links
tortricidae.com

Cochylini
Tortricidae genera